The Oituz is a right tributary of the river Trotuș in Romania. It discharges into the Trotuș in Onești. The following towns and villages are situated along the river Oituz, from source to mouth: Oituz (CV), Poiana Sărată, Oituz (BC), Bogdănești and Onești.

References

Rivers of Romania
Rivers of Bacău County
Rivers of Covasna County